The 3000 metres steeplechase or 3000-meter steeplechase (usually abbreviated as ) is the most common distance for the steeplechase in track and field. It is an obstacle race over the distance of the 3000 metres, which derives its name from the horse racing steeplechase.

Rules
It is one of the track events in the Olympic Games and the World Athletics Championships; it is also an event recognized by World Athletics.

The water jump consists of a barrier followed by a pit of water with a landing area defined as follows: The pit is 3.66 m (12 feet) square. The pit's forward-direction measurement starts from the approach edge of the barrier and ends at the point where the water jump slope reaches the flat surface of the steeple pathway. Rulebook language simply but clearly says "The water jump, including the hurdle, shall be 3.66 m in length." Pits have an upward slope; the water is deeper near the barrier and is within 2 cm of ground level at the departure end.

The circuit has four ordinary barriers and one water jump. During the course of the race, each runner must clear a total of 28 ordinary barriers and seven water jumps. This entails seven complete laps after starting with a fraction of a lap run without barriers. The water jump is located on the back turn, either inside the inner lane or outside the outer lane. If it is on the outside, then each of the seven laps is longer than the standard 400 m, and the starting point is on the home straight. If the water jump is on the inside, each lap is shorter than 400 m, the starting point is on the back straight, so the water jump and barrier in the home straight are bypassed in the first half lap at the start.

Unlike those used in hurdling, steeplechase barriers do not fall over if hit, and the rules allow an athlete to negotiate the barrier by any means, so many runners step on top of them. Four barriers are spaced around the track on level ground, and a fifth barrier at the top of the second turn (fourth barrier in a complete lap from the finish line) is the water jump. The slope of the water jump rewards runners with more jumping ability, because a longer jump results in a shallower landing in the water.

All-time top 25

Men
Correct as of June 2022.

Notes
1 Until 2002 he was known as Stephen Cherono, and represented Kenya.

Annulled marks
The following athletes had their performance (inside 7:55.00) annulled due to doping offences:
Brahim Boulami 7:53.17 (Zürich 2002)

Women
Correct as of August 2022.

Annulled marks
The following athletes had their performances (inside 9:08.00) annulled due to doping offences:
Yuliya Zaripova 9:05.02 (Stockholm 2012)
Marta Domínguez 9:07.32 (Berlin 2009)

Olympic medalists

Men

Women

World Championships medalists

Men

Women

Season's bests

Men

Women

National records
Updated 21 August 2022.

Men
NR's inside 8:30.00 min:

Women
NR's inside 9:30.00 min:

References

External links
IAAF list of 3000-metres steeplechase records in XML
Steeplechase at the Olympic Games at Sports Reference

Events in track and field
Steeplechase (athletics)
Summer Olympic disciplines in athletics
Middle-distance running